FC Manu Laeva is a Tuvaluan football club from Nukulaelae that currently plays in the Tuvalu A-Division. 

The team's home ground is the Tuvalu Sports Ground, the only football field in Tuvalu. Manu Laeva plays on an amateur level, as do all the teams in Tuvalu. They also have a reserve squad and a women's team.

History
Manu Laeva was formed in 1980. The first name was Tavakisa for A team and the B Team Called Young Kisa. In 1998 Tavakisa and Young kisa were renamed Manu Laeva A and Manu Laeva B. In 1998 and 2001, they won their first prizes. Manu Laeva won 6-0 against FC Nanumaga in 1998 Tuvalu KnockOut Cup. Of all teams they won the Tuvalu Games the most. They won it in 2008, 2009, and 2011 and 2014.

Current squad
As of 5 July 2017.

Manu Laeva B

Managers 
 Foai Paeniu (1988)
 Ioane Peleti (1998)
 Fiafiaga Lusama (????–2012)
 Rebery Pasene (2012)
 Pasene Malaki (2012–)

Staff

Honours

Cup 
Tuvalu Knockout Cup
Winners (2): 1998, 2001

Independence Cup for Outer Islands Teams
Winners (1): 2009

Independence Cup
Winners (1): 2011
Runners-up (3):1988, 1990, 2003

Tuvalu Games
Winners (3): 2008, 2009, 2011, 2014

Christmas Cup
Winners (2): 2012, 2013,

See also
 Manu Laeva Women

External links 
 vriendenvantuvalu.nl
 tnfa.tv

Football clubs in Tuvalu
Nukulaelae
1980 establishments in Tuvalu
Association football clubs established in 1980